Macedonius II (died c. 517), patriarch of Constantinople (495–511). For an account of his election see Patriarch Euphemius of Constantinople

Biography
Within a year or two (the date is uncertain) he assembled a council, in which he confirmed in writing the acts of the Council of Chalcedon. In 507 Elias, patriarch of Jerusalem, who had been unwilling to sanction the deposition of Euphemius, united himself in communion with Macedonius. The emperor Anastasius employed all means to oblige Macedonius to declare against the Council of Chalcedon, but flattery and threats were alike unavailing. An assassin named Eucolus was even hired to take away his life. The patriarch avoided the blow, and ordered a fixed amount of provisions to be given monthly to the criminal. The people of Constantinople were equally zealous for the council of Chalcedon, even, more than once, to the point of sedition. To prevent unfavourable consequences, Anastasius ordered the prefect of the city to follow in the processions and attend the assemblies of the church.

In 510 the Anastasius made a new effort. Macedonius would do nothing without an ecumenical council at which the bishop of Rome should preside. Anastasius, annoyed at this answer, and irritated because Macedonius would never release him from the engagement he had made at his coronation to maintain the faith of the church and the authority of the council of Chalcedon, sought to drive him from his chair. He sent Eutychian monks and clergy, and sometimes the magistrates of the city, to load him with public outrage and insult. This caused such a tumult amongst the citizens that the emperor was obliged to shut himself up in his palace and to have ships prepared in case flight should be necessary. He sent to Macedonius, asking him to come and speak with him. Macedonius went and reproached him with the sufferings his persecutions caused the church. Anastasius stated his willingness to this, but at the same time made a third attempt to tamper with the beliefs of the patriarch.

One of his instruments was Xenaïas, a Eutychian bishop. He demanded of Macedonius a declaration of his faith in writing; Macedonius addressed a memorandum to the emperor insisting that he knew no other faith than that of the Fathers of Nicaea and Constantinople, and that he anathematized Nestorius and Eutyches and those who admitted two Sons or two Christs, or who divided the two natures. Xenaïas, seeing the failure of his first attempt, found two individuals who accused Macedonius of an abominable crime, avowing themselves his accomplices. They then charged him with Nestorianism, and with having falsified a passage in an epistle of Paul, in support of that sect. At last the emperor commanded him to send by master of the offices the authentic copy of the Acts of the council of Chalcedon signed with the autographs of the bishops. Macedonius refused, and hid it under the altar of the great church. Thereupon Anastasius had him carried off by night and taken to Chalcedon, to be conducted thence to Eucaïta in Pontus, the place of the exile of his predecessor. In 515 Pope Hormisdas worked for the restitution of Macedonius, whom he considered unjustly deposed; it had been a stipulation in the treaty of peace between the rebel Vitalian, a relative of Macedonius, and Emperor Anastasius that the patriarch and all the deposed bishops should be restored to their sees. But Anastasius never kept his promises, and Macedonius died in exile. His death occurred c. 517, at Gangra, where he had retired for fear of the Huns, who ravaged all Cappadocia, Galatia, and Pontus.

References

Attribution
 cites
Evagrius Scholasticus III. xxxi. xxxii. in ib. 2661
Liberat. vii. in ib. 982
Mansi, viii. 186, 198
Theodoret. Lect. ii. 573–578, in Patr. Gk. lxxxvi.
Theophanes Chronicle 120–123, 128, 130, 132
Victor of Tonnenna Chronicle, in Patrologia Latina lxviii. 948

5th-century patriarchs of Constantinople
6th-century patriarchs of Constantinople
Macedonius III
Year of birth unknown